is a Japanese director. He is the son of animator and film director Hayao Miyazaki, who is one of the co-founders of Studio Ghibli. Described as "reluctant" to follow his father's career, Goro initially worked as a landscaper for many years before entering the film business. He has directed three films—Tales from Earthsea (2006), From Up on Poppy Hill (2011), and Earwig and The Witch (2020).

Biography
Miyazaki was born to animators Hayao Miyazaki and Akemi Ōta in Tokyo. While growing up, Gorō and his younger brother Keisuke found sketches of their parents' work. As a high school student, Gorō thought that he "would never be able to reach the level [his father] has attained." Gorō instead decided to pursue an interest in landscape architecture. After graduating from Shinshu University's School of Agriculture, Gorō later worked as a construction consultant in the planning and designing of parks and gardens. In 1998, Gorō was involved in the design of the Ghibli Museum in Mitaka, and served as its director from 2001 to June 2005.

Animation career
Miyazaki's first film was Tales from Earthsea, an adaptation of Ursula K. Le Guin's Earthsea book series. Written by Miyazaki and Keiko Niwa, the film stars Junichi Okada, Bunta Sugawara and Aoi Teshima. Originally joining the animation project as a consultant, Miyazaki was asked to draw the storyboards. After viewing his storyboards, producer Toshio Suzuki decided Miyazaki should direct the film.

The move to direct the film caused friction between Gorō and his father, who felt his son did not have the experience to direct a film; the two were said not to have spoken throughout the movie's development. Despite this, Gorō Miyazaki was determined to complete the project.

On June 28, 2006, Gorō held the first preview of the completed Tales from Earthsea, which was attended by his father. Hayao was seen to have "accepted Gorō" and after, delivered to his son a message, saying the film "...was made honestly. It was good." The film was released on July 29, 2006, to positive reviews, but received mixed reviews when comparing to the other Ghibli movies, and grossed $68 million worldwide. However, Miyazaki was presented Japan's Bunshun Raspberry Award for "Worst Director", with Tales from Earthsea receiving the award for "Worst Movie", at the end of 2006. The film was nominated in 2007 for the Japan Academy Prize for Animation of the Year (losing to The Girl Who Leapt Through Time) and was selected in the Out of Competition section at the 63rd Venice Film Festival.

In 2011, Miyazaki directed From Up on Poppy Hill, which is based on Chizuru Takahashi and Tetsurō Sayama's 1980 manga Kokurikozaka kara. The adaptation was written by Hayao Miyazaki and Keiko Niwa and the film stars Masami Nagasawa, Keiko Takeshita. Yuriko Ishida, Jun Fubuki, Takashi Naito, Shunsuke Kazama, Nao Omori and Teruyuki Kagawa. Miyazaki also voiced the world history teacher character and wrote lyrics to some of the songs used in the film. From Up on Poppy Hill was released on July 16, 2011, in Japan, to positive reviews. The film won the 2012 Japan Academy Prize for Animation of the Year.

On January 31, 2014, it was announced that Gorō Miyazaki would direct his first anime television series, Ronja, the Robber's Daughter, an adaptation of Astrid Lindgren's Ronia, the Robber's Daughter for NHK. The series is computer-animated, produced by Polygon Pictures, and co-produced by Studio Ghibli. The show ran for one season, from 2014 to 2015, with a total of 26 episodes.

In May 2020, Toshio Suzuki confirmed that a new film from Gorō Miyazaki is in development at Studio Ghibli. On June 3, 2020, Studio Ghibli announced that the film would be an adaptation of the novel Earwig and the Witch by Diana Wynne Jones. The film was announced as the first full 3D CG animated Ghibli film and slated for a television premiere on NHK in Winter of 2020, under the title .  Earwig and the Witch had its world premiere on October 18, 2020, at the Lumière Film Festival, before premiering in Japan on television on December 30, 2020, on NHK General TV; it was later released in theatres in Japan by Toho on August 27, 2021.

Works

Films 
 Tales from Earthsea (2006), director and screenwriter
 Ponyo (2008), animator
 From Up on Poppy Hill (2011), director
 Earwig and the Witch (2020), director

TV series 
 Ronja, the Robber's Daughter (2014), director

References

External links
 
 
 Information at GhibliWiki
 Interview at GhibliWorld.com

1967 births
Anime directors
Landscape or garden designers
Living people
Hayao Miyazaki
People from Tokyo
Studio Ghibli people